Alfred Farag (14 June 1929 in Kafr Al-Sayyadin, Zagazig, Egypt  – 4 December 2005 ) was one of the eminent
Egyptian playwrights of the post-1952 Revolution period. He obtained his BA in English Literature from the Faculty of Arts, Alexandria University in 1949. He then began a teaching career that lasted until 1955, when he abandoned it for a post in the press as a literary critic. He worked at several press institutions, including: “Rose El Youssef”, “El Tahrir” and “Al Gomhouriyya”.

Farag took part in the establishment of the public management for the “mass culture” project and in the foundation of artistic groups in Egypt. He also had an important role in the introduction of theatre in Egypt’s provinces. He, with many great writers like Noaman Ashour, Saad Eddin Wahba, Michael Roman, Rashad Roushdy and Yousef Edrees, contributed in the “nothing like” renaissance of theatre in the sixties.

Alfred Farag wrote his first play “Fall of Pharaoh” (1957) at the age of 26. He thenproceeded with his career as a writer. He wrote approximately 52 plays, including: “The Barber of Baghdad” (1964), “Sulayman Al-Halabi” (1965), “Al-Zayr Salim” (1967) and “Atwa with the Jack-Knife” (1993), in addition to some one-act plays such as “Voice of Egypt” (1956) and “The Trap” (1965). In his plays, he discusses serious issues like the problem of national independence in “The Epistles of the Judge of Seville” (1987), and the Palestinian issue in “Fire and Olives” (1970). Some of his works were translated into German and English such as “Ali Janah Al - Tabrizi and his Servant Quffa” (1969) or into English only such as “Marriage on a Divorce Notification” (1973). In addition to being a playwright, he also wrote novels such as “The Story of the Lost Time” (1977) and “The Days and Nights of Sindbad” (1988), and short stories.

In his writings, he eloquently mixed the Egyptian Colloquial Arabic with the Standard Arabic which made his works unique and easy for people to understand. Critics became interested in Farag's dramatic language as it was vivid and far from the formal style used by his predecessors. He believed that the language should contribute in giving a “visual” illustration of the text What made him different from others is that he revived the old heritage on stage as if it was real, and that he used heritage without getting superficial.

Farag was granted several international, Arab and Egyptian awards and medals. The best known award was “Jerusalem” given by the General Union for Arab Writers as he was the first Egyptian intellectual to receive such an award. He also received the National Award for Play writing in 1965, and the Science and Arts Medal of the first order in 1967.

Farag died on 4 December 2005 at the age of 76 in the St Mary's Hospital, London after a long term of illness. He was buried in Cairo.

Bibliography
Baghdad Barber (Hallaa' Baghdad), 1964.
Suleiman Al-Halabi, 1965.
Al-Zeir Salim, 1966.
Ala Genah el-Tabreezi wa tabiu'ahu quffa, 1969.
Directory of the smart spectator to theater- study- 1969.

References

See also
List of Copts
Lists of Egyptians
Sharif Malikah

1929 births
2005 deaths
People from Zagazig
Coptic dramatists and playwrights
Egyptian dramatists and playwrights
Egyptian people of Coptic descent
Alexandria University alumni
20th-century dramatists and playwrights